Anya is a musical with a book by George Abbott and Guy Bolton and music and lyrics by Robert Wright and George Forrest.  As they had done with Song of Norway (1944) and Kismet (1953), Wright and Forrest developed the musical score using themes written by a classical composer, in this case Sergei Rachmaninoff.

Based on Bolton's 1954 English adaptation of Marcelle Maurette's 1952 play Anastasia and the subsequent 1956 film adaptation of the same name, it focuses on Anya who, when discovered in a Berlin psychiatric facility in 1925 by taxi driver Bounine, a former Cossack general in Czarist Russia, claims to be Anastasia, the supposedly murdered youngest daughter of Emperor Nicholas II.

A number of fictional elements, including a romantic triangle involving Anya, Bounine, and his mistress Genia and the addition of a comical character, café proprietor Katrina, weakened the plot of the true story. It also continued to perpetuate the notion that the Dowager Empress had met Anya in real life, when in fact the two never crossed paths.

After sixteen previews, the Broadway production, directed by Abbott and choreographed by Hanya Holm, opened on November 29, 1965, at the Ziegfeld Theatre. Denounced as an old-fashioned operetta by the critics, it closed after only 16 performances, the last production to be presented in the historic venue, which had housed the original Show Boat in 1927.

The cast included Constance Towers as Anya, Michael Kermoyan as Bounine, Karen Shepard as Genia, Irra Petina as Katrina, and Lillian Gish as the Dowager Empress. Supporting roles were played by George S. Irving and John Michael King.

The production was nominated for the Tony Award for Best Scenic Design. An original cast recording was released by United Artists Records.

The show was later reworked under several names: A Song for Anastasia (1967), The Anastasia Game (1989 and 1990), The Anastasia Affaire (1992), and Anastasia, the Musical (1998).
A cast recording was made in 1992 using mostly 1989 cast which was re-released and expanded in 1998.

Song list

Act I
A Song from Somewhere
Vodka, Vodka!
So Proud
Homeward
Snowflakes and Sweethearts (The Snowbird Song)
On That Day
Anya
Six Palaces
Hand in Hand
This Is My Kind of Love
On That Day (Reprise)

Act II
That Prelude!
A Quiet Land
Here Tonight, Tomorrow Where?
Leben Sie Wohl
If This Is Goodbye
Little Hands
All Hail The Empress

References

Not Since Carrie: Forty Years of Broadway Musical Flops by Ken Mandelbaum, published by St. Martin's Press (1991), pages 235-36

External links
 Internet Broadway Database listing
 Floormic Listing

1965 musicals
Broadway musicals
Musicals based on plays
Musicals based on films
Cultural depictions of Grand Duchess Anastasia Nikolaevna of Russia